Jeff C. Agenbroad is a former Republican member of the Idaho Senate. He represented the 13th district, which covers parts of the city of Nampa from 2016 to 2022.

Biography
Jeff Agenbroad was born in Boise, later moving to Nampa where he graduated from Nampa High School.

Agenbroad graduated with a bachelor's degree in business finance from the University of Idaho in 1986, with a degree in agricultural finance from Washington State University in 1991, and from the Pacific Coast Banking School at the University of Washington in 1997. Agenbroad is a banker by profession, beginning with U.S. Bank in 1986. From 1996 until 2003, he was vice president and area manager with Washington Mutual Bank, and served as owner and vice president of the TitleOne Corporation from 2003 until 2008. He is also President and CEO of Since 86, Inc. since 2008, and has worked for Zions Bank since 2013. Agenbroad also served as a board member of the Idaho Health Insurance Exchange. Agenbroad was appointed to the Senate in 2016, replacing Curt McKenzie, who unsuccessfully ran for the Idaho Supreme Court. He served as chairman of the Senate Finance Committee and the Co-Chairman of the Joint Finance and Appropriations Committee.  During his term Senator Agenbroad authored/sponsored 105 bills in the Senate with a 99% passage rate of his sponsored bills.

Political positions

Agenbroad stated his top priorities were "investing in Idaho through education, infrastructure, and the economy." He describes himself as a fiscal conservative and opposes the Patient Protection and Affordable Care Act. Brian Lenney defeated Jeff C. Agenbroad by +15% in the Republican primary for Idaho State Senate District 13 on May 17, 2022.

Personal life
Agenbroad and his wife, Patricia, have 2 adult children: Tony and Amy.

References

1960s births
Living people
American bankers
Businesspeople from Idaho
Republican Party Idaho state senators
People from Boise, Idaho
People from Nampa, Idaho
University of Idaho alumni
University of Washington Foster School of Business alumni
Washington State University alumni
21st-century American politicians